The 2011 Matchworld Women's Cup was the first edition of the Matchworld Women's Cup, a global invitational tournament for national teams in women's football (soccer). Held in Switzerland in June 2011, matches were staged in Savièse, Apples and Naters. Denmark won the four team tournament which also featured New Zealand, Colombia and Wales. They played against each other in a single round-robin tournament with the group winner also being the winner of the tournament.

Table

Results

Winners

Goalscorers
3 goals
  Sanne Troelsgaard Nielsen

2 goals
  Kristine Pedersen
  Carmen Rodallega

Notes

External links
Matchworld Group

2011 in women's association football
2011
2010–11 in Danish women's football
2010–11 in New Zealand association football
2010–11 in Welsh women's football
2011 in Colombian football
2011